Saman Tilakasiri (11 August 1928 – 5 January 2000) was a Sri Lankan poet, journalist and an award-winning author. He was a Senior Editor with "Lankadeepa" at Times of Ceylon and the Chief Editor of "Rasavahini" magazine. His published work include research on Sinhala literature, Sinhala grammar lessons, and a number of popular Sinhala books for children and youngsters, several of which won national awards, presidential award and UNICEF Book Competition for "Year of the Children 1979". Children's books by Saman Tilakasiri have become classic contributions to the Sri Lankan and Sinhala literature due to their unique story-telling style that combines conversational and lyrical poetic expression to tell a story which is also enjoyed by adults.

Saman Tilakasiri was also a lyricist with a rare catalogue of signature songs sung by prominent Sri Lankan musicians Sisira Senaratne, and children's songs by Nanda Malini. He also assisted budding artists in their early career such as prominent musician Visharad W. D. Amaradeva.

Early life 
Saman Tiakasiri was born to a rural family in Nawagamuwa, Devalegama in the Kegalle District. Henaka Arachchilage Appuhamy Senanayake was his father, and Bamuru Arachchilage Tikiri Menike was his mother. His elder brother H. M. Tilakaratne constructed a school in Nawagamuwa and Saman was the first student admitted to the new school, where he had his primary education. Then he joined Kegalle Maha Vidyalaya and continued his studies.

Saman started his literary work, writing and composing poetry at the age of 12 years. While he was a student, he engaged himself as the newspaper reporter of the Kegalle District.

He wrote poems, articles on literature and current topics, and many of his writings were published in national newspapers and magazines such as "Sinhala Bauddhaya", "Nidahasa", "Peramuna" and "Kavi Sammelanaya", etc.

Career 
Fluent in Sinhala and English, Saman joined the staff of Lankadeepa, the prominent national newspaper, in 1952 as a translator. Eminent journalist, the late Mr. D. B. Dhanapala was a source of inspiration for Saman to become a much-respected journalist in the course of time. He continued to work and was elevated to the post of Sub-Editor and Feature Editor. Later he was also the Editor of "Rasavahini Magazine." He also contributed his writing to many publications such as "Sanskruthi", "Dina Dina", "Cinema" and other newspapers. He composed lyrics for popular songs, and helped new artists to break through in the early stages of career. One such discovery was Visharad W. D. Amaradeva.

He excelled in writing stories and poems for children. His poetry book "Pasal Lama Gee" (meaning of name: School Children's Songs) was adjudged the Best Children's Book in 1969. Saman was the pioneer to receive the award for any books for children in Sri Lanka. In 1979 he won an award for his poetry collection "Mal Onchilla" (meaning of name: Flower Swings) at the national book competition for 1979, the Year of the Children by United Nations. He continued to win awards and accolades many a times.

Saman also made translations for Children's Books from Chinese Folklore in a series titled "Cheena Lama Katha I and II" (Chinese Stories for Children.) Saman has completed the draft for the third book of this series, but was not able to publish it prior to his demise. The book is awaiting to be accepted by a suitable Publishing and Distribution House in Sri Lanka. His previous books were published by publishing houses "Dayawansa Jayakody" and "Godage"  who work closely with writers in Sri Lanka to support the literary industry.

Body of work 
Saman Tilakasiri's body of work includes: 
1962 Puwath Path Kalaawa (Journalism)
1969 Pasal Lamaa Gee (Poetry)
1969 Cheena Lama Katha I (Stories, translated)
1970 Cheena Lama Katha II (Stories, translated)
1972 Punchi Suranganawi (Poetry)
1974 Kurulu Thegga (Story)
1976 Masuru Mithuru (Story)
1976 Nawa Hela Gee (Poetry)
1981 Mal Onchilla (Poetry)
1982 Amama Raala (Story)
1983 Gamaraalage Wangediya (Story)
1984 Makara Babaa (Story)
1986 Peni Rupaya (Story)
1987 Senkadagala Den Kutu Kutu (Poetry)
1988 Weki Huruwa (Grammar)
1988 Saahitya Wimasuma (Literature)[

Unpublished work 

Saman Tilakasiri has written folk tales, Jataka stories and poetry collections and arranged for publishing. They are ready to be printed, complete with illustrations. But he could not do so because of his sudden illness which permeated him from doing anything further, and some of his best work could not yet come to light after his demise on Wednesday 5 January 2000.

See also 
 Lankadeepa
 Times of Ceylon
 W. D. Amaradeva
 Nanda Malini
 Sisira Senaratne

Bibliography

 
1969 Pasal Lamaa Gee (Poetry)
1969 Cheena Lama Katha I (Stories, translated)
1970 Cheena Lama Katha II (Stories, translated)
1972 Punchi Suranganawi (Poetry)
1974 Kurulu Thegga (Story)
1976 Masuru Mithuru (Story)
1976 Nawa Hela Gee (Poetry)
1981 Mal Onchilla (Poetry)
1982 Amama Raala (Story)
1983 Gamaraalage Wangediya (Story)

1984 Makara Babaa (Story)
1986 Peni Rupaya (Story)
1987 Senkadagala Den Kutu Kutu (Poetry)
1988 Weki Huruwa (Grammar)
1988 Saahitya Wimasuma (Literature)
1989

References

Sources
 Press Reader
 Sunday Times
 Newspaper direct

1928 births
2000 deaths
Sri Lankan poets
Sinhala-language poets
Sri Lankan journalists
Sinhalese writers
Sri Lankan novelists
20th-century journalists